Robert Hunter Brown Bennie (27 March 1900 – 27 July 1972) was a Scottish footballer who played as a left half.

Bennie was capped three times by the Scotland national team between 1925 and 1926, while playing club football for Airdrieonians (where he spent eight years, making over 300 appearances, finishing runners-up in the Scottish Football League on four occasions and winning the Scottish Cup in 1924). In 1928 he was signed by Heart of Midlothian for £2,300, moving on to become manager of Raith Rovers five years later.

He was the most prominent member of a footballing family: his uncles Peter and John had short careers in Scotland, another uncle Bob played for St Mirren and Newcastle United, and his cousin Peter for Burnley and Bradford City.

References

Sources

External links

International stats at Londonhearts.com

1900 births
1972 deaths
Scottish footballers
Scotland international footballers
Airdrieonians F.C. (1878) players
Heart of Midlothian F.C. players
Scottish Football League players
Scottish Football League representative players
Scottish football managers
Raith Rovers F.C. managers
Scottish Football League managers
Parkhead F.C. players
Third Lanark A.C. players
Association football wing halves
Scottish Junior Football Association players
Footballers from Falkirk (council area)